Diane Donnelly Stone is an American former professional tennis player.

Donnelly, along with Katrina Adams, won the 1987 NCAA doubles championship, while competing for Northwestern University. The pair featured together in the women's doubles main draw at the 1987 US Open. She also played in some professional satellite tournaments and reached a career high world ranking of 209 in doubles, winning two ITF titles.

Both Donnelly and her sister Tracey, who played collegiate tennis, have lived with Type I diabetes since childhood and have an annual scholarship named after them to help student-athletes with diabetes.

ITF finals

Doubles: 2 (2–0)

References

External links
 
 

Year of birth missing (living people)
Living people
American female tennis players
Northwestern Wildcats women's tennis players
People with type 1 diabetes